A head shot is a specific type of portrait where the focus is on person's face.

Head shot or headshot may also refer to:

Arts, entertainment, and media

Films
 Headshot (2011 film), a Thai thriller film directed by Pen-Ek Ratanaruang
 Headshot (2016 film), an Indonesian martial arts action film directed by The Mo Brothers
 Bullet to the Head (working title: Headshot), a 2012 American action thriller film directed by Walter Hill

Other uses in arts, entertainment, and media
"Head Shots", a 2013 episode of the American television drama series The Killing
 "Headshot", a 2005 episode of the TV series Yes, Dear
 Headshots: Se7en, a compilation album by the American hip hop duo Atmosphere
 Headshot, in video gaming, an attack aimed at the target's head
 "Headshot" (song), a 2021 song by Lil Tjay, Polo G, and Fivio Foreign

Other uses
 Headshot, a time-out inducing action according to National Dodgeball League rules